Lithothelium quadrisporum is a species of corticolous (bark-dwelling) lichen in the family Pyrenulaceae. Found in Thailand, it was formally described as a new species in 2006 by Dutch lichenologist André Aptroot. Here, in a sheltered secondary rainforest, the thin pale green to brownish thallus of the lichen was found growing on the bark of a tree trunk. The specific name refers to the asci, which are the only consistently four-spored asci in genus Lithothelium.

References

Eurotiomycetes
Lichen species
Lichens described in 2006
Lichens of Asia
Taxa named by André Aptroot